Venus is the fifth studio album by American singer-songwriter Joy Williams. It is her first album since the 2014 breakup of The Civil Wars and her first solo album outside of the contemporary Christian music genre.

Critical reception

At Metacritic, which assigns a "weighted average" rating out of 100 from selected independent ratings and reviews from mainstream critics, the album received a Metascore of 66, based on 8 reviews, indicating "generally favorable reviews". Sarah Rodman of The Boston Globe called the album an "unsparingly intimate, deeply moving 11-song cycle." Timothy Monger of AllMusic writes that the album is "an expansive, decidedly modern record that marries Spartan electronic landscapes with warm acoustic elements." Matt Conner of CCM Magazine also praised the album, awarding it 5 stars out of 5 and calling it "a powerful presentation of a very vulnerable journey inward to rediscover her artistry." In a more mixed review, Haydon Spenceley of Drowned in Sound wrote that Venus is "full of emotive and nuanced performances, the aches of her heart resonating powerfully. However, the sheen and the bombast of much of the production reeks not just of a kind of entitlement, but of desperation."

Track listing

Personnel
 Richie Biggs – Engineer
 Michael Einziger – classical guitar, producer
 Daniel James – electric guitar, keyboards, producer, vocals
 Ted Jensen - mastering
 Oliver Kraus – strings
 Jerry McPherson – electric guitar
 Paul Moak – acoustic guitar
 Matt Morris – executive producer, multiple instruments, producer, vocals
 Charlie Peacock – engineer, producer
 Mark Stent – mixing

Charts

References

External links

2015 albums
Joy Williams (singer) albums
Columbia Records albums
Albums produced by Charlie Peacock